Time in Latvia is given by Eastern European Time (EET; UTC+02:00). Daylight saving time, which moves one hour ahead to UTC+03:00 is observed from the last Sunday in March to the last Sunday in October.

IANA time zone database 
In the IANA time zone database, Latvia is given one zone in the file zone.tab – Europe/Riga. Data for Latvia directly from zone.tab of the IANA time zone database; columns marked with * are the columns from zone.tab itself:

See also 
Time in Europe
List of time zones by country
List of time zones by UTC offset

References

External links 
Current time in Latvia at Time.is